Les Scouts et Guides Pluralistes de Belgique is a coeducational, nonreligious Scouting movement in French-speaking Belgium. This movement, known until 1992 as Fédération des Éclaireuses et Éclaireurs is the francophone branch after the split of the Boy-Scouts et Girl-Guides de Belgique (BSB-GGB) in 1966. Pluralist Scouts are officially recognized by the French Community in Wallonia-Brussels and are active members of the Council of the Conseil de la Jeunesse d’Expression française and the Confédération des Organisations de Jeunesse indépendantes et pluralistes (COJ).

Branches 
From 5 to 21 years old, young people are divided into different branches:
Castors (Beavers), from 5 to 8 years old
Louveteaux (Cubs), 8 to 12 years old
Guides et scouts (Guides and Scouts), 12 to 15 years old
Pionniers (Pioneers), 15 to 18 years old
Clan, from 18 to 21 years old

Uniform 
The uniform of the pluralist Scouts is composed of a scarf with the colors of its unit and a gray shirt. Girls and boys wear the same uniform. For the bottom in general there is no set rule, but some troops insist on wearing shorts.

Logo 
The logo of the Scouts et Guides Pluralistes de Belgique is explained as:
 a youth, action movement
 The girl and boy are moving
 The blocks are oblique, not symmetrical and placed in an open framework sketched in pencil.
 boys and girls together
 The characters form adapted
 It is outside their scope, one to the other
 Scouting
 The word Scout in letters
 The neckerchief is the Scout subject par excellence
 specificity Pluralistic
 The word "pluralism"! (This specificity is underscored by the assertive green label below)
 The four different colours

References

Scouting and Guiding in Belgium
World Association of Girl Guides and Girl Scouts member organizations